Jean-Luc Rasamoelina (born 4 October 1989) is an Angolan rower. He competed in the men's lightweight double sculls event at the 2016 Summer Olympics. At the Olympics, Rasamoelina and his partner André Matias finished second in the Men's Lightweight Double Sculls D-Final and 20th overall.

References

External links
 

1989 births
Living people
Angolan male rowers
Olympic rowers of Angola
Rowers at the 2016 Summer Olympics
Sportspeople from Luanda
Angolan people of Malagasy descent